The 2004 Saxony state election was held on 19 September 2004 to elect the members of the 4th Landtag of Saxony. The incumbent Christian Democratic Union (CDU) government led by Minister-President Georg Milbradt lost its majority. The CDU subsequently formed a grand coalition with the Social Democratic Party (SPD), and Milbradt was re-elected as Minister-President.

Parties
The table below lists parties represented in the 3rd Landtag of Saxony.

Opinion polling

Election result

|-
|colspan=8 align=center| 
|-
! colspan="2" | Party
! Votes
! %
! +/-
! Seats 
! +/-
! Seats %
|-
| bgcolor=| 
| align=left | Christian Democratic Union (CDU)
| align=right| 855,203
| align=right| 41.1
| align=right| 15.8
| align=right| 55
| align=right| 21
| align=right| 44.4
|-
| bgcolor=| 
| align=left | Party of Democratic Socialism (PDS)
| align=right| 490,488
| align=right| 23.6
| align=right| 1.4
| align=right| 31
| align=right| 1
| align=right| 25.0
|-
| bgcolor=| 
| align=left | Social Democratic Party (SPD)
| align=right| 204,438
| align=right| 9.8
| align=right| 0.9
| align=right| 13
| align=right| 1
| align=right| 10.5
|-
| bgcolor=| 
| align=left | National Democratic Party (NPD)
| align=right| 190,909
| align=right| 9.2
| align=right| 7.8
| align=right| 12
| align=right| 12
| align=right| 9.7
|-
| bgcolor=| 
| align=left | Free Democratic Party (FDP)
| align=right| 122,605
| align=right| 5.9
| align=right| 4.8
| align=right| 7
| align=right| 7
| align=right| 5.6
|-
| bgcolor=| 
| align=left | Alliance 90/The Greens (Grüne)
| align=right| 106,771
| align=right| 5.1
| align=right| 2.5
| align=right| 6
| align=right| 6
| align=right| 4.8
|-
! colspan=8|
|-
| bgcolor=| 
| align=left | Human Environment Animal Protection (Tierschutz)
| align=right| 34,068
| align=right| 1.6
| align=right| 1.6
| align=right| 0
| align=right| ±0
| align=right| 0
|-
| bgcolor=|
| align=left | Others
| align=right| 75,652
| align=right| 3.6
| align=right| 
| align=right| 0
| align=right| ±0
| align=right| 0
|-
! align=right colspan=2| Total
! align=right| 2,080,135
! align=right| 100.0
! align=right| 
! align=right| 124
! align=right| 4
! align=right| 
|-
! align=right colspan=2| Voter turnout
! align=right| 
! align=right| 59.6
! align=right| 1.5
! align=right| 
! align=right| 
! align=right| 
|}

Outcome
The most striking result of the election was the entrance of the far-right National Democratic Party (NPD) into the Landtag with 12 seats. This gained international attention. The party's support was concentrated in the rural areas; commentators attributed its success to alienation stemming from economic depression. The continuing strength of the SED successor party, the Party of Democratic Socialism, which again was the second largest party, was also notable.

The CDU remained the largest party with 55 of 124 seats, but lost its majority, forcing it to find coalition partners. The most logical was the classical liberal Free Democratic Party, who entered the Landtag in the election, but a CDU–FDP government would be one seat short of the necessary majority. Cooperation with the PDS or The Greens was ideologically unfeasible. A theoretical alliance between the CDU and NPD would hold a majority, but this was out of the question. The result was a grand coalition CDU and SPD. This government outcome was later mirrored in the 2005 federal election. The CDU's Georg Milbradt remained in office as Minister-President. Notably, the NPD received two more votes on the ballot for Minister-President than it had members in the Landtag. It is presumed that two CDU Landtag members backed the NPD as a protest against the grand coalition.

Notes

Sources
 The Federal Returning Officer

Elections, 2004
2004 elections in Germany